P. Sai Sharan is a Carnatic musician and Indian playback singer from Chennai, Tamil Nadu. He rose to prominence after winning the third season of the  Airtel Super Singer. He was previously a top 4 finalist in the debut season of the junior version of the show, Airtel Super Singer Junior.

Early life 
Saisharan started his music journey by giving his first Carnatic music concert at the age of 8 at the Thyagaraja Aradhana in Thiruvaiyaru.

Career

Television works
Saicharan competed in a number of reality TV singing competitions. He initially entered the finals of the debut season of Vijay TV's Airtel Super Singer Junior. He subsequently appeared as a member of the "Tiruchi Thimingalangal" team led by playback singer Srilekha Parthasarathy in the debut season of Sun TV's  Sangeetha Mahayuddham, in which he and his team were crowned the runner up at the grand finale.

Saisharan rose to prominence in 2011 after being crowned the winner of season 3 of Vijay TV's Airtel Super Singer, when he was a 21 year old engineering student. Saicharan received training in Carnatic music prior to participating in the competition. He was previously a top 4 finalist in the debut season of the junior version of the show, Airtel Super Singer Junior. He auditioned for season 3 of the show, and participated in most of the main competition performance rounds. When he was eliminated from the competition by the permanent judges by half a mark, the decision was challenged by viewers. He subsequently qualified as a wildcard contestant, and re-entered the competition as a grand finalist after receiving the highest number of viewer votes.

Saicharan was crowned the winner of the competition, and was awarded an apartment by the show's sponsor Arun Excello. He was chosen by A. R. Rahman and D. Imman to sing in the 2012 films Godfather, Manam Kothi Paravai, and Saattai.

In 2013, Saicharan captained the "Symphony Super Kings" team in the debut season of Airtel Super Singer T20, before he and his team were crowned the winner of the show. In 2015, Saisharan also captained his "White Devils" team to victory in Super Singer T20 season 2. His performances through Vijay TV's Super Singer TV series which were considered hits by viewers have included:

Playback singing
In 2012, Sai Sharan was formally introduced as a Tamil playback singer. He made his film debut co-singing "Dang Dang" in the movie Manam Kothi Paravai with Malavika, who was also a contestant in the music competition reality TV show, Airtel Super Singer 3.

References

Singers from Chennai
Living people
Tamil playback singers
Indian male playback singers
1992 births
21st-century Indian male classical singers
Male Carnatic singers
Carnatic singers